BattleBots: Bounty Hunters is a spinoff of the Discovery Channel's BattleBots.  This show's first four episodes premiered on Discovery+ on January 4, 2021 and the Discovery Channel on March 18, 2021.

Format
One iconic, destructive bot from the TV show BattleBots is chosen to be the bounty.  Eight bots compete in a bracket to become the "bounty hunter" which will compete with the bounty bot.  If the bounty hunter bot wins, the bot's team wins a portion of a $25,000 purse.  The same rules and judging system apply as in BattleBots season 10.

Contestants

Bounty Hunters Bracket

Bounty #1: Bronco

Bounty Match: Bronco vs. Rotator (UD)

Bounty #2: Icewave

Bounty Match: Icewave vs. Skorpios (UD)

Bounty #3: Tombstone

Bounty Match: Tombstone (KO) vs. Gruff

Bounty #4: BETA

Bounty Match: BETA vs. Lock-Jaw (KO)

Bounty #5: Witch Doctor

Bounty Match: Witch Doctor (KO) vs. SubZero

Bounty #6: Son of Whyachi

Bounty Match: Son of Whyachi vs. Gigabyte (KO)

Episodes

References

BattleBots
2021 American television series debuts
Discovery Channel original programming